Hibbertia salicifolia is a species of flowering plant in the family Dilleniaceae and is endemic to eastern Australia. It is a shrub with loose reddish bark, linear to oblong leaves and yellow flowers with the stamens arranged all around the carpels.

Description
Hibertia salicifolia is an erect, relatively large shrub with all but its youngest branchlets covered with loose, reddish bark. Flowering occurs from spring to early autumn.

Taxonomy
This species was first formally described in 1817 by Augustin Pyramus de Candolle in Regni Vegetabilis Systema Naturale and given the name Adrastaea salicifolia from specimens collected near Botany Bay. In 1859, Ferdinand von Mueller changed the name to Hibbertia salicifolia in Fragmenta Phytographiae Australiae. The specific epithet (salicifolia) means "willow-leaved".

Distribution and habitat
Hibbertia salicifolia grows in coastal swamps and heath from south-east Queensland to the Royal National Park in New South Wales.

References

salicifolia
Flora of New South Wales
Flora of Queensland
Plants described in 1817
Taxa named by Augustin Pyramus de Candolle